The 34th Thailand National Games (Thai:การแข่งขันกีฬาแห่งชาติ ครั้งที่ 34 “ราชบุรีเกมส์”) also known (2004 National Games, Ratchaburi Games) held in Ratchaburi, Thailand during 18 to 28 December 2004. Representing were 35 sports and 76 disciplines.

Sports

 Aquatics (Swimming)
 Athletics
 Badminton
 Basketball
 Billiards and Snooker
 Bodybuilding
 Boxing
 Bowling
 Bridge
 Cycling (Track, Road, and Mountain biking)
 Dancesport
 Equestrian
 Fencing
 Football
 Golf
 Gymnastics (Artistic and Rhythmic)
 Handball
 Hoop takraw
 Judo
 Kabaddi
 Karate
 Muay Thai
 Pétanque
 Rowing
 Rugby football
 Sepak takraw
 Shooting
 Taekwondo
 Table tennis
 Tennis
 Volleyball (Indoor and Beach)
 Weightlifting
 Wrestling
 Wushu

Top 10 Medals

National Games
Thailand National Games
National Games
Thailand National Games
National Games